Gamid Ruslanovich Agalarov (born 16 July 2000) is a Russian football player of Dargin descent who plays as a centre-forward for Akhmat Grozny.

Club career
He made his debut in the Russian Professional Football League for Anzhi-2 Makhachkala on 11 May 2018 in a game against FC Krasnodar-2.

He made his debut in the Russian Premier League for Anzhi Makhachkala on 28 July 2018 in a game against FC Ural Yekaterinburg.

On 24 January 2020 he signed a long-term contract with Russian Premier League club Ufa. On 22 January 2021, he joined Volgar Astrakhan on loan. He became the top scorer of the 2021–22 Russian Premier League with 19 goals scored. He was also voted best Under-21 player of the season by the league.

On 15 July 2022, Agalarov signed a three-year contract with Akhmat Grozny.

International career
He was called up to the Russia national football team for the first time for October 2021 World Cup qualifiers against Slovakia and Slovenia.

Personal life
His father is Ruslan Agalarov and his uncle is Kamil Agalarov.

Career statistics

References

External links
 
 

2000 births
Footballers from Makhachkala
Russian people of Dagestani descent
Living people
Russian footballers
Russia youth international footballers
Russia under-21 international footballers
Association football forwards
FC Anzhi Makhachkala players
FC Ufa players
FC Volgar Astrakhan players
FC Akhmat Grozny players
Russian Premier League players
Russian First League players
Russian Second League players
21st-century Russian people